Luk Bawan is a village  in Doru Shahabad Tehsil of Anantnag district in Jammu and Kashmir, India.

Transport

By Rail
Sadura Railway Station and Anantnag Railway Station are the very near by railway stations to Luk Bawan. However ever Jammu Tawi Railway Station is major railway station  243 km near to Luk Bawan.

References

External links

Villages in Anantnag district